San Javier is a town in San Javier Municipality, in the Mexican state of Sonora.  The elevation is 650 meters. 

Most of the small population is involved in animal raising and subsistence farming.

References

External links
San Javier, Ayuntamiento Digital (Portal Oficial del Municipio de San Javier, Sonora)

Populated places in Sonora
Populated places established in 1706